The American Athletic Conference (AAC), also known as the American, is an American collegiate athletic conference, featuring 11 member universities and five affiliate member universities that compete in the National Collegiate Athletic Association's (NCAA) Division I, with its football teams competing in the Football Bowl Subdivision (FBS). Member universities represent a range of private and public universities of various enrollment sizes located primarily in urban metropolitan areas in the Northeastern, Midwestern, and Southern regions of the United States.

The American's legal predecessor, the original Big East Conference, was considered one of the six collegiate power conferences of the Bowl Championship Series (BCS) era in college football, and The American inherited that status in the BCS's final season. With the advent of the College Football Playoff in 2014, The American became a "Group of Five" conference, which shares one automatic spot in the New Year's Six bowl games.

The league is the product of substantial turmoil in the old Big East during the 2010–14 conference realignment period. It is one of two conferences to emerge from the all-sports Big East in 2013. While the other successor, which does not sponsor football, purchased the Big East Conference name, The American inherited the old Big East's structure and is that conference's legal successor. However, both conferences claim 1979 as their founding date, and the same history up to 2013. The American is headquartered in Irving, Texas, and led by Commissioner Michael Aresco.

The current full members of the conference are the University of Central Florida, University of Cincinnati, East Carolina University, University of Houston, University of Memphis, University of South Florida, Southern Methodist University, Temple University, Tulane University, University of Tulsa, and Wichita State University, though Central Florida, Cincinnati, and Houston will be departing the conference on July 1, 2023. The University of Alabama at Birmingham, Florida Atlantic University, University of North Carolina at Charlotte, University of North Texas, Rice University, and University of Texas at San Antonio will be joining as full members on July 1, 2023. The American also has seven affiliate members: California State University, Sacramento, University of Florida, Florida International University, James Madison University, United States Naval Academy, Old Dominion University, and Vanderbilt University.

History

The Big East

The Big East Conference was founded in 1979 as a basketball conference and included the colleges of Providence, St. John's, Georgetown, and Syracuse, which in turn invited Connecticut (UConn), Holy Cross, Rutgers, and Boston College to be members. UConn and Boston College would accept the invitation, while Holy Cross soon thereafter declined the invitation, and Rutgers eventually declined and remained in the Atlantic 10 Conference (then known as the Eastern 8 Conference). Seton Hall was then invited as a replacement and the conference started play with seven members.

Villanova and Pittsburgh joined shortly thereafter under the leadership of the first Big East commissioner, Dave Gavitt.

The conference remained largely unchanged until 1991, when it began to sponsor football, adding Miami as a full member, and Rutgers, Temple, Virginia Tech, and West Virginia as football-only members. Rutgers and West Virginia were offered full all-sports membership in 1995, while Virginia Tech waited until 2000 for the same offer. Temple football was kicked out after the 2004 season, but rejoined in 2012 and intended to become a full member in 2013.

The unusual structure of the Big East, with the "football" and "non-football" schools, led to instability in the conference. The waves of defection and replacement brought about by the conference realignments of 2005 and the early 2010s revealed tension between the football-sponsoring and non-football schools that eventually led to the split of the conference in 2013.

Realignment and reorganization

The conference was reorganized following the tumultuous period of realignment that hobbled the Big East between 2010 and 2013. The Big East was one of the most severely impacted conferences during the most recent conference realignment period. In all, 14 member schools announced their departure for other conferences, and 15 other schools announced plans to join the conference (eight as all-sports members, and four for football only). Three of the latter group later backed out of their plans to join (one for all sports, and the other two for football only).

On December 15, 2012, the Big East's seven remaining non-FBS schools, all Catholic institutions consisting of DePaul, Georgetown, Marquette, Providence, St. John's, Seton Hall, and Villanova announced that they voted unanimously to leave the Big East Conference effective June 30, 2015. The "Catholic 7", by leaving, were looking for a more lucrative television deal than the one they would receive by remaining with the football schools. In March 2013, representatives of the Catholic 7 announced they would leave the conference effective June 30, 2013, retaining the Big East name, $10 million, and the right to hold the conference's basketball tournament at Madison Square Garden.

Following the announcement of the departure of the Catholic 7 universities, the remaining ten football-playing members started the process of selecting a new name for the conference and choosing a new site to hold its basketball tournament. Various names were considered, with the "America 12" conference reportedly one of the finalists until rejected by college presidents sensitive of adding a number to the end of the conference name. On April 3, 2013, the conference announced that it had chosen a new name: American Athletic Conference. The conference also revealed that it prefers the nickname "The American" because it was thought "AAC" would cause too much confusion with the Atlantic Coast Conference (ACC).

Louisville and Rutgers spent one season in the newly renamed conference. On July 1, 2014, Louisville joined the ACC and Rutgers joined the Big Ten Conference. On that same day, East Carolina, Tulane, and Tulsa joined The American for all sports, while Sacramento State and San Diego State joined as affiliate members for women's rowing. Navy joined as an affiliate member in football on July 1, 2015.

Addition of Wichita State

For the next several years, The American did not discuss the addition of any new members. However, in March 2017, media reports indicated that the conference was seriously considering adding one or more new members specifically as basketball upgrades. Wichita State, Dayton, and VCU were reportedly considered, with Wichita State being seen as the strongest candidate. By the end of that month, it was reported that talks between the American and Wichita State had advanced to the point that the two sides were discussing a timeline for membership, with the possibility of the Shockers joining as a full but non-football member as early as the 2017–18 school year. The report indicated that a final decision would be made in April. The conference's board of directors voted unanimously on April 7 to add Wichita State effective in July 2017, making the Shockers the league's first full non-football member since the Big East split.

Departure of UConn
On June 21, 2019, a Boston-area sports news website, Digital Sports Desk, revealed that UConn was expected to announce by the end of the month that it would leave the American for the Big East Conference in 2020. The story was picked up by multiple national media outlets the next day. The main issue that reportedly had to be resolved prior to any official announcement was the future of UConn football, as the Big East does not sponsor that sport, and sources indicated that the American had no interest in retaining UConn as a football-only member. Reportedly, American Conference insiders were not surprised by UConn's prospective move, as that school had been vigorously opposed to that league's most recently announced television deal.

National media believed that should UConn leave the American, the conference's likeliest response would be to bring in two new schools—one for football only and a second in non-football sports, similar to the American's sequential additions of Navy and Wichita State. The most likely prospects for football-only membership were seen as Army (currently an FBS independent, with most of its other sports in the Patriot League), and Air Force (currently an all-sports member of the Mountain West Conference). Any of several schools could potentially fill the non-football slot, with Pete Thamel of Yahoo Sports considering VCU to be "the most logical target there." Thamel dismissed the prospect of the American adding a new all-sports member, saying "there's no obvious candidate who could add value in both basketball and football."

On June 24, 2019, it was reported that the Big East had formally approved an invitation for UConn to join the conference. On June 26, 2019, the UConn Board of Trustees accepted the invitation and they are expected to join the league for the 2020–2021 season. On July 26, media reports indicated that UConn and The American had reached a buyout agreement that confirmed UConn's Big East arrival date as July 1, 2020, paying the American a $17 million exit fee.

It was widely reported that UConn was "rejoining" the Big East, given that the Huskies would be reunited with many of the schools against which it played for three decades in the original Big East. Indeed, UConn was the last charter member of the old Big East still playing in The American.

Added stability
The American took a number of steps to stabilize the conference after the departure of UConn. The first move was the addition of Old Dominion University as an affiliate member in women's lacrosse for the 2020–21 season. Old Dominion was previously added to The American for women's rowing beginning in the 2018–19 season.

The American moved their headquarters from Providence, Rhode Island to Irving, Texas. This was a planned move, to better centralize the conference offices with the member schools. Irving is in the Dallas–Fort Worth metroplex, which is also home to the headquarters of the Big 12 Conference, College Football Playoff, and the National Football Foundation. The conference also moved the men's basketball tournament to the region, to be played at the new Dickies Arena until 2022.

In the wake of the COVID-19 pandemic, some member schools have eliminated sports due to budget constraints. The University of Cincinnati eliminated its men's soccer program while East Carolina University canceled men and women's swimming and diving teams and tennis teams. Women's rowing member San Diego State University dropped that sport effective with the end of the 2020–21 season.

Big 12 raid and subsequent invitations to the conference 
In late July 2021, founding Big 12 members Oklahoma and Texas jointly announced that they planned to leave the conference no later than 2025, and formally requested an invitation from the Southeastern Conference (SEC). Shortly thereafter, The American became a peripheral player in this saga when the Big 12 sent a cease and desist letter to current broadcast partner ESPN, charging the network with conspiring to damage the league by luring Oklahoma and Texas to the SEC, and also alleging that the network encouraged an unnamed conference to raid the Big 12 to pave the way for an earlier departure by Oklahoma and Texas. A later media report identified that other conference as The American. ESPN issued an official denial of the Big 12 charges, and officials from The American declined to comment.

On September 3, Sports Illustrated reported that the Big 12 Conference was on the verge of inviting four schools— including American Conference members Cincinnati, Houston, and UCF. Later that month, all three schools received and accepted membership offers on the date of the presidents' meeting, with the official announcement stating only that they would join the Big 12 no later than 2024–25. On June 10, 2022, The American and the three departing schools announced a buyout agreement had been reached, confirming those schools' 2023 departure date. At the time, it was possible that Cincinnati and UCF could remain in the conference as affiliate members for women's lacrosse and men's soccer, respectively, as the Big 12 does not sponsor those sports, though no formal announcement has been made. UCF would later accept an offer of men's soccer membership from the Sun Belt Conference effective in 2023, aligning its men's soccer program with that of West Virginia, the only pre-2023 Big 12 member sponsoring men's soccer.

Subsequent moves  
In late September 2021, several national media outlets reported that Mountain West Conference (MW) members Air Force and Colorado State had approached The American regarding a possible move to that league. However, on October 1, the MW announced that its current membership would remain intact for the foreseeable future, removing its 12 football members (including football-only member Hawaii) from the list of potential new members for The American. For its part, The American officially denied extending invitations to the two Colorado schools.

Later that month on October 18, 2021, Yahoo! Sports reported that The American was preparing to receive applications from six of the 14 members of Conference USA—Charlotte, Florida Atlantic, North Texas, Rice, UAB, and UTSA. This would make The American a 14-full-member conference. The next day, ESPN reported that all six schools had submitted applications, and that each would receive a formal letter by the end of that week (October 22) detailing the terms of conference expansion. All six schools were accepted on October 21, and the conference confirmed their 2023 entry date on June 16, 2022.

Expansion in men's soccer and women's swimming & diving 
A series of further realignment moves centering on the Sun Belt Conference (SBC) led to The American's men's soccer league expanding earlier than planned. This sequence began in November 2021 when James Madison announced its departure from the Colonial Athletic Association (CAA) to join the SBC in 2023. The CAA responded by invoking a provision of its bylaws to ban JMU from further conference championship events. The SBC responded by pushing JMU's entry forward to 2022.

Soon after this, the other three C-USA members set to move to the SBC in 2023 (Marshall, Old Dominion, and Southern Miss, with Marshall and ODU sponsoring men's soccer) announced that they would instead leave in 2022. Following a brief legal dispute, C-USA and the three schools reached a settlement that allowed those schools to join the SBC in 2022. With three men's soccer schools now joining in 2022 instead of 2023, the SBC announced it would reinstate men's soccer at that time. The new full members were joined by three full SBC member and three new associate members. Coastal Carolina, played the 2021 season in C-USA. The other two full SBC members, Georgia Southern and Georgia State played the MAC.  The new associates were Kentucky and South Carolina, which had been single-sport C-USA members since 2005; and West Virginia, which had previously announced that it would move men's soccer from the Mid-American Conference to C-USA in 2022.

C-USA was then left with only four men's soccer programs for 2022 (Charlotte, FIU, Florida Atlantic, and UAB), with all but FIU set to become full American members in 2023. The American accordingly brought all four schools as new men's soccer members for 2022, with FIU remaining an affiliate after the others fully join The American.

Similar changes came to women's swimming & diving, again due in part to SBC expansion. Of the schools leaving C-USA for the SBC in 2022, Marshall and Old Dominion sponsor that sport, and incoming American members Florida Atlantic, North Texas, and Rice also sponsor the sport (although Rice fields swimmers only, with no divers). The American brought the aforementioned future full members, plus FIU, into its women's swimming & diving league. As with men's soccer, FIU will remain a women's swimming & diving affiliate after the other schools fully join The American.

Commissioners

Membership timeline

Member universities

The conference currently has 11 full member institutions – and six affiliate members – in 12 states, including California, Florida, Kansas, Louisiana, Maryland, North Carolina, Ohio, Oklahoma, Pennsylvania, Tennessee, Texas, and Virginia. The newest full member, Wichita State is the only one that does not sponsor football.

Departing members are highlighted in red.

Current members

Notes

Affiliate members

Notes

Future full members

Former full members
Three full members have departed from the conference.

Former affiliate members
Two affiliate members have left the conference.

Notes

Sports
The American currently sponsors championship competition in 10 men's and 12 women's NCAA sanctioned sports. Old Dominion and Sacramento State are affiliate members for women's rowing. Florida, Old Dominion, Vanderbilt, and James Madison are affiliate members for women's lacrosse. South Florida and Charlotte will add women's lacrosse teams in the 2024–25 school year.

Under NCAA rules reflecting the large number of male scholarship participants in football and attempting to address gender equity concerns (see also Title IX), each member institution is required to provide more women's varsity sports than men's.

Men's sponsored sports by school
Departing members are highlighted in red.

Men's varsity sports not sponsored by The American which are played by conference schools:

Women's sponsored sports by school
Departing members are highlighted in red.

Women's varsity sports not sponsored by The American which are played by conference schools:
Future members in gray.

Conference champions

Note: Shared titles (ex: 2014 football, 2020 men's basketball) are counted as a full title for each co-champion.

Accurate as of May 9, 2022.

*- Does not include vacated championships

†- No longer a member of the AAC

‡- Affiliate member

NCAA national championships

No current American Conference member has won an NCAA team championship while a member of the conference. The only school to have won a national title while in The American, UConn, left for the Big East Conference in 2020. Several members have won national titles before joining The American.

Excluded from these lists are all national championships earned outside the scope of NCAA competition, including Division I FBS football titles, Inter-Collegiate Sailing Association titles, women's AIAW titles, National Collegiate Equestrian Association titles, retroactive Helms Athletic Foundation titles, and ITA tennis titles.

Team championships won by current members

Team championships won as American Conference members 
Includes all titles won while a member of The American, whether or not the conference sponsored that sport at the time.

Individual and relay championships by current members

Football

The conference began football during the 1991–92 season, and it was a founding member of the Bowl Championship Series. Previously, conference opponents operated on a two-year cycle, as a home-and-home series.

The conference previously did not have enough teams to form divisions, but it now does after Navy joined the conference in 2015. When Navy joined in 2015 and the conference's divisions were created, Navy was placed in the West division along with Houston, Memphis, SMU, Tulane, and Tulsa. Teams play eight conference games a season. Since 2015, each team has played the other five teams in its own division, as well as three teams from the other division, operating in a four-year cycle ensuring that each school will play every conference opponent at home and on the road at least once in the four-year cycle. At the end of each regular season, the East division winner and the West division winner, as determined by final conference record, meet in the American Athletic Conference Football Championship Game, played at the home site of one of the division winners.

With the departure of Connecticut after the 2019 season, the divisions were affected by the reduction to an uneven number of teams. At the time, The American had no plan to add another team to rebalance divisions, so the conference eliminated the divisions. The championship game is now played by the two teams that achieved the best record in regular season conference play. With the upcoming expansion of the conference to 14 members, a divisional split is now likely after all new members join.

Like the conference itself, football experienced much transition through its history. In fact it was the main force behind such departures and expansion. In 2003, the BCS announced that it would adjust the automatic bids granted to its six founding conferences based on results from 2004 to 2007. With the addition of Cincinnati, Louisville, and South Florida in 2005, the conference retained its BCS automatic-qualifying status. 

At one point, the 2007 South Florida Bulls football team was ranked No. 2 in the BCS rankings, but the team finished No. 21 in the final poll. 

The 2009 Cincinnati Bearcats football team finished the regular season undefeated at 12–0, and the team was ranked No. 3 in the final BCS standings, barely missing the opportunity to play for the BCS National Championship. The conference overall was 9–7 (.563) in BCS bowl games, the third highest winning percentage among the AQ conferences. 

The 2017 UCF Knights football team, a member of the American, was undefeated, but the team was not invited to the College Football Playoff. The team earned the Group of Five's New Year's Six bowl bid and defeated Auburn in the Peach Bowl. The team claimed a national championship, which was recognized by the Colley Matrix, one of the NCAA recognized selectors of the national champion in football.

The Cincinnati became the first Group of Five team ever to appear in the top four of the CFP rankings at any point of the season, going on to become the first G5 team ever selected for the CFP semifinals.

All-time school and conference records
As of the conclusion of the 2021 season.
Conference wins and losses are since the formation of The American.

Football champions

The American Championship Game pits the Eastern Division representative against the Western Division representative in a game held following the conclusion of the regular season. The site of the Championship Game is the home stadium of the division champion with the best overall conference record. In the event that the two division champions are tied, then the head-to-head record shall be used as the tiebreaker. Prior to the 2015 season, when the conference split into two six-team divisions and created a conference championship game, The American awarded its championship to the team(s) with the best overall conference record.

  BCS or NY6 Bowl Game
 ^ College Football Playoff game

Rivalries
The American has many rivalries among its member schools, primarily in football. Some rivalries existed before the conference was established or began play in football. Recent conference realignment in 2005 and 2013 ended – or temporarily halted – many rivalries. Before their departure to other conferences, a number of former member schools held longtime rivalries within the conference.

Records as of the end of the 2021 season.

Bowl games
Following the 2013 season, the BCS era came to a close and was replaced by the College Football Playoff. Four teams play in two semifinal games, with the winners advancing to the College Football Playoff National Championship. Six bowl games — the Rose Bowl, Sugar Bowl, Orange Bowl, Cotton Bowl, Fiesta Bowl, and Peach Bowl — will rotate as hosts for the semifinal games, and host major bowls when they do not host semifinal games (access bowls).

With the birth of the College Football Playoff, The American lost its automatic qualifying status for one of the major bowls. Instead, one automatic qualifying spot is reserved for the highest ranked team from the "Group of Five" conferences – The American, Conference USA, the Mid-American Conference, Mountain West Conference, and Sun Belt Conference.

Although the pick order usually corresponds to the conference standings, the bowls are not required to make their choices strictly according to the won-lost records; many factors influence bowl selections, especially the likely turnout of the team's fans. Picks are made after any applicable College Football Playoff selections. If a team is selected for the one of the access bowls or playoff, the bowl with the No. 2 pick will have the first pick of the remaining teams in the conference.

Head football coach compensation
The total pay of head coaches includes university and non-university compensation. This includes base salary, income from contracts, foundation supplements, bonuses and media and radio pay.

Records as of the end of the 2022 season

Conference individual honors

Coaches and media of The American award individual honors at the end of each football season.

Men's basketball

In June 2013, it was announced that the inaugural men's basketball tournament would take place at FedExForum in Memphis. FedExForum had previously hosted eight Conference USA basketball tournaments.

Even though the Big East Conference was meant to be a basketball-oriented conference, UConn, a member of The American, won the 2014 NCAA Division I men's basketball tournament (the first after the conferences split).

All-time school records by winning percentage
This list goes through the 2020–21 season.

Source

American Athletic Conference Men's Basketball NCAA Bids
This list goes through the 2020–21 season. Only current American Conference members are included. However, this list covers the entire histories of basketball at the listed institutions, not just their American Conference tenures.

Men's basketball champions

Rivalries
The American has many rivalries among its member schools, some of which existed before the conference was established. Recent conference realignment in 2005 and 2013 ended – or temporarily halted – many rivalries. Before their departure to other conferences, a number of former member schools held longtime rivalries within the conference.

Results as of the 2020–21 season.

Women's basketball

In June 2013, it was announced that the inaugural women's basketball tournament would take place at the Mohegan Sun in Connecticut. Women's basketball teams have played a total of 20 times in the NCAA Women's Division I Basketball Championship (since 1982), with UConn winning 11 national championships under head coach Geno Auriemma since 1995. Women's national championship tournaments prior to 1982 were run by the AIAW.

All-time school records by winning percentage
This list goes through the 2016–17 season.

Women's basketball champions

Facilities
Departing members in pink. Future members in gray.

Academics
One of the current full member schools, Tulane University, is a member of the Association of American Universities (AAU), an organization of 62 leading research universities in the United States and Canada. Seven members are doctorate-granting universities with "very high research activity," the highest classification given by the Carnegie Foundation for the Advancement of Teaching. Member schools are also highly ranked nationally and globally by various groups, including U.S. News & World Report, Washington Monthly, and Times Higher Education.

Broadcasting and media rights 
In March 2019, the conference announced a $1 billion, 12-year media rights deal with ESPN, under which the majority of AAC content will be aired on ESPN properties. Selected basketball games and Navy football are sub-licensed to CBS Sports, as Navy had a previous deal with CBS prior to joining The American. Content not aired on linear television will be exclusive to ESPN's subscription package ESPN+, but a larger number of events (including at least 40 football games and 65 men's basketball games per-season, including the conference semi-finals and championship) will air on ABC and ESPN's linear networks than under the previous contract.

See also

 List of American collegiate athletic stadiums and arenas
 List of NCAA conferences
 Big East Conference (2013–present)
 Big East Conference (1979–2013)

Notes

References

External links
 

 
Articles which contain graphical timelines